Richard Day Lawrence (July 31, 1930 – December 9, 2016) was a United States Army lieutenant general who served as Commanding General, 1st Cavalry Division from 1980 to 1982. He later served as commandant of the United States Army War College from 1982 to 1983 and president of the National Defense University from 1983 to 1986. Lawrence earned a B.S. degree in military science from the United States Military Academy in 1953. He later received an M.S. degree in mechanical engineering from the University of Southern California in 1961 and a Ph.D. degree in industrial engineering (operations research) from the Ohio State University in 1968. His doctoral thesis was entitled A Study of Quasi-Analytic Models for Improvement of the Military Commander's Tactical Decision Process. Lawrence also graduated from the United States Army Command and General Staff College in 1966 and the Army War College in 1970.

His military honors include the Defense Distinguished Service Medal, two Army Distinguished Service Medals, two Silver Stars and two awards of the Legion of Merit.

Lawrence died in 2016 and was interred at Rose Lawn Cemetery in Tyler, Texas.

References

1930 births
2016 deaths
People from Eastland, Texas
United States Military Academy alumni
Military personnel from Texas
University of Southern California alumni
United States Army Command and General Staff College alumni
Ohio State University alumni
United States Army personnel of the Vietnam War
Recipients of the Air Medal
Recipients of the Silver Star
United States Army War College alumni
Recipients of the Legion of Merit
United States Army generals
Recipients of the Distinguished Service Medal (US Army)
Presidents of the National Defense University
Recipients of the Defense Distinguished Service Medal